Qeshlaq (also Romanized as Qeshlāq; also known as Qeshlāq Būzarjomehr) is a village in Qeshlaq Rural District, in the Central District of Khorrambid County, Fars Province, Iran. At the 2006 census, its population was 895, in 246 families.

References 

Populated places in Khorrambid County